Hope Spots are ecologically unique areas of the ocean designated for protection under a global conservation campaign overseen by Mission Blue, a non-profit organization founded by Sylvia Earle with her 2009 TED prize wish.

Hope Spots can be Marine Protected Areas (MPA) that need attention or new sites. They are chosen for their contributions to biodiversity, the carbon sink, and important habitat. Hope Spot status is intended to alleviate the pressures human resource extraction places on the ocean by making the site higher priority to become an MPA, where resource extraction, like fishing and drilling, may be forbidden under law.

There are 140 Hope Spots worldwide (as of June,2022). An additional 22 nominations for Hope Spots are currently under consideration and three nominations have been deferred.

At the time of Earle's wish, less than 1% of the ocean was protected. Earle advocated for the creation of a system of parks like the national park system in the United States. The goal of the Hope Spot campaign is raise public support, gain the attention of leaders and policy makers, and ultimately create enough Hope Spots to protect 20% of the ocean by 2020.

Nominations process 

Since September 9, 2016, nominations for Hope Spots have been open to the public. Following the completion of the Hope Spot nomination form found on Mission Blue's website, a proposed Hope Spot is evaluated to assess its validity. The Hope Spots Council, composed of marine scientists and policy experts, examine new nominations twice a year and choose which sites to designate as Hope Spots.

Partnerships 

Mission Blue has partnered with the International Union for Conservation of Nature (IUCN) and receives support from National Geographic, Rolex, and Google. To increase access and promote the campaign, Google has added Hope Spots to its platform enabling users to explore the sites. A Google-powered map of Hope Spots can be found on Mission Blue's website.

Council members 
 Sylvia Earle
 Carl Gustaf Lundin
 Dan Laffoley
 Dr. Ameer Abdulla
 William N. Kostka
 Dr. Lance Morgan
 Kathy Walls
 Dr. Sebastian Troëng
 Sandra Bessudo Lion
 Rili Djohani
 Dr. Claudio Campagna
 Kristina Gjerde
 Sabine Jessen

Hope Spots

Atlantic Ocean 
 Abrolhos Bank
 Aguadilla, Puerto Rico - nomination to be considered
 Ascension Island
 Baffin Bay - nomination under consideration
 Bahamian Reefs
 Bay of Fundy
 Cape Whale Coast (Hermanus)
 Cashes Ledge
 Charlie-Gibbs Fracture Zone
 Chichiriviche de la Costa
 Choroni & Chuao
 Coastal Southeast Florida
 Corales de Varadero / Varadero´s Coral Reef
 Cozumel Reef and the Mayan Riviera
 East Portland Fish Sanctuary
 Egg Island
 False Bay
 Farm Pond - nomination under consideration
 Gardens of the Queen
 George Town Harbor, Grand Cayman
 Gulf of Guinea
 Gulf of Mexico Deep Reefs
 Hatteras
 Kosterfjorden/Yttre Hvaler
 Mesoamerican Reefs
 Molasses Reef - nomination under consideration
 Moray Firth - nomination under consideration
 Mosquito Lagoon
 Patagonian Shelf
 Saint Vincent & the Grenadines Marine Area
 Sargasso Sea
 Southeast Shoal of the Grand Banks
 The North Atlantic Ocean within the New York Bight - nomination under consideration
 Wadden Sea - nomination under consideration

Arctic Ocean 
 Central Arctic Ocean
 Gakkel Ridge
 Marine Arctic Peace Sanctuary (MAPS) - nomination under consideration
 Northwest Passage

Indian Ocean 
 Andaman Islands
 Atlantis Bank
 Chagos Archipelago
 Coral Seamount
 Grand Récif de Toliara
 Houtman Abrolhos - nomination under consideration
 Houtman Abrolhos Islands - nomination under consideration
 Karai Challi Island - nomination deferred
 Knysna
 Lakshadweep Islands
 Maldive Atolls
 Mergui Archipelago
 Musandam Peninsula - nomination under consideration
 Outer Seychelles
 Plett
 Quirimbas Islands
 The Agulhas Front
 Walter's Shoal

Mediterranean Sea 
 Balearic Islands
 Grotte di Ripalta  - nomination under consideration
 Island of Sardinia, Italy - nomination under consideration
 Mushroom, Halat - nomination under consideration
 Syvota - nomination under consideration
 Vatika Bay - nomination under consideration
 Venetian Lagoon - nomination under consideration

Pacific Ocean 
 Beagle Channel - nomination under consideration
 Bering Sea Deep Canyons
 California Seamounts and Ridges - nomination under consideration
 Central American Dome
 Chilean Fjords & Islands
 Chiloé National Park Expansion
 Coral Sea
 Coral Triangle
 Core of the South Pacific Gyre
 Coron Bay - nomination under consideration
 Golfo Dulce, Costa Rica
 Eastern Pacific Seascape
 Emperor Seamount Chain
 French Overseas Territories (Wallis & Futuna)
 Gulf of California
 Gulf of the Farallones
 Hecate Strait & Queen Charlotte Sound Glass Sponge Reef
 Kermadec Trench
 Lord Howe Rise
 Malpelo Island
 Micronesian Islands
 Misool Marine Reserve - nomination under consideration
 Monterey Bay
 Moreton Bay
 Northeastern Hawaiian Islands - nomination under consideration
 Osa Pelagic Dolphin Protected Area - nomination deferred
 Pacific Subtropical Convergence Zone
 Saanich Inlet and the Southern Gulf Islands
 Salas Y Gómez and Nazca Ridges
 Salish Seas - nomination deferred
 Scott Islands
 Tasman Sea
 The White Shark Café
 Tribugá Gulf
 Tropical Pacific Sea of Peru
 Western Pacific Donut Holes (four enclaves)

Southern Ocean 
 East Antarctic Peninsula
 Ross Sea
 Subantarctic Islands and Surrounding Seas

See also 
 Marine park
 Marine spatial planning
 Special Protection Area
 Specially Protected Areas of Mediterranean Importance
 United States National Marine Sanctuary

References

External links 
 Mission Blue - Hope Spots
 TED Prize Winning Wishes - Mission Blue

Marine conservation